Ștefan Secăreanu (born 8 January 1959, Chioselia Mare) is a journalist and politician from Moldova.

Biography 

Ștefan Secăreanu graduated from Moldova State University and worked for TeleRadio-Moldova. He was the editor in chief of Deșteptarea (1989–1990) and Țara. He served as a member of the Parliament of Moldova (1998–2009).

References

1959 births
Living people
Moldova State University alumni
Moldovan journalists
Male journalists
Popular Front of Moldova politicians
Electoral Bloc Democratic Moldova MPs
Moldovan MPs 1998–2001
Moldovan MPs 2001–2005
Moldovan MPs 2005–2009